WGRG (100.5 FM) is a 1980s rock station serving the Quad Cities area. Known as "100.5 WGRG", the station's main studios are located in Geneseo, Illinois.

References

External links
 

Radio stations in the Quad Cities